Natko Devčić (30 June 1914 – 4 September 1997) was a Croatian composer.

Devčić was born in Glina. He graduated from the Academy of Music, University of Zagreb. He died in Zagreb.

One of his better known pieces is the Istrian Suite which he wrote in 1946.

References

1914 births
1997 deaths
People from Glina, Croatia
Yugoslav composers
Croatian composers
Academy of Music, University of Zagreb alumni
Vladimir Nazor Award winners
Burials at Mirogoj Cemetery
Jasenovac concentration camp survivors